Asesela Sadole is a Fijian politician. He is a former member of the now-disbanded Senate of Fiji and represented Ba.

References

I-Taukei Fijian members of the Senate (Fiji)
Living people
Year of birth missing (living people)
Politicians from Ba Province
Place of birth missing (living people)

He was the Leader of the Senate in 2006
He was also the first Secretary of the Great Council of Chiefs
Worked in the Fiji Civil Service for more than 30 Years in the Fijian Affairs Board.
Served as a Second Class Magistrate in the Fiji Judiciary
Educated at the then Matavelo School in Nailaga , Ba and then furthered his studies at DAV College in Ba.Attained his LLB at Bond University,Gold Coast,Australia.